Thermoanaerobacterales Family IV is a family of rod-shaped, motile bacteria in the order Thermoanaerobacterales of the phylum Bacillota. These microorganisms are spore-forming, anaerobic and moderately thermophilic (growing at optimal temperatures about 50°C) and stain Gram-positive. Because of uncertainty in the taxonomic assignment of its members, this family is referred to as "Incertae sedis".

References 

Bacteria families
Thermoanaerobacterales Family IV. Incertae Sedis
Thermophiles
Anaerobes